The Official Opposition Shadow Cabinet of the 40th Canadian parliament is listed below.  Members are drawn from the Liberal Party of Canada. Michael Ignatieff announced a new line-up of Liberal critics on 7 September 2010.

Liberal Shadow Cabinet

Parliamentary leadership
Leader of the Official Opposition & Intergovernmental Affairs – Michael Ignatieff
Deputy Leader – Ralph Goodale
Opposition House Leader – David McGuinty
Deputy House Leader – Judy Foote
Chief Opposition Whip – Marcel Proulx
Deputy Opposition Whip – Yasmin Ratansi
Leader of the Opposition in the Canadian Senate – Sen. Jim Cowan
Deputy Leader of the Opposition in the Senate – Sen. Claudette Tardif
Chief Opposition Whip in the Senate – Sen. Jim Munson

Shadow Ministers                   
Aboriginal Affairs – Todd Russell
Agriculture, Agri-food & Canadian Wheat Board – Wayne Easter
Amateur Sport – Joyce Murray
Arctic Issues & Northern Development – Larry Bagnell
Canadian Heritage – Pablo Rodríguez
Citizenship & Immigration – Justin Trudeau
Consular Affairs, Consumer Affairs – Dan McTeague
Crown Corporation – Bonnie Crombie
Economic Development Agency for Regions of Quebec and Associate Finance Critic – Alexandra Mendes
Democratic Renewal – Carolyn Bennett
Environment – Gerard Kennedy
Finance – Scott Brison
Fisheries, Oceans & Atlantic Canada Opportunities Agency – Rodger Cuzner
Foreign Affairs – Bob Rae
La Francophonie – Raymonde Folco
Health – Ujjal Dosanjh
Human Resources & Skills Development – Mike Savage
Human Rights – Irwin Cotler
Industry, Science & Technology – Marc Garneau
International Cooperation – Glen Pearson
International Trade – Martha Hall Findlay
Justice & Attorney-General – Marlene Jennings
Labour – Maria Minna
Multiculturalism – Rob Oliphant
National Defence – Dominic LeBlanc
National Revenue – Jean-Claude D’Amours
Natural Resources – Denis Coderre
Official Languages – Mauril Belanger
Pacific Gateway and Western Economic Diversification – Sukh Dhaliwal
Public Safety & National Security – Mark Holland
Public Works & Government Services  – Geoff Regan
Rural Affairs – Mark Eyking
Seniors and Pensions – Judy Sgro
Small Business – Navdeep Bains
Southern Ontario Development Agency – Frank Valeriote
Status of Women – Anita Neville
Transport, Infrastructure & Communities – John McCallum
Treasury Board – Siobhan Coady
Tourism – Gerry Byrne
Veterans Affairs – Kirsty Duncan
Water – Francis Scarpaleggia

See also
Cabinet of Canada
Official Opposition (Canada)
Shadow Cabinet
Bloc Québécois Shadow Cabinet
New Democratic Party Shadow Cabinet

External links
Liberal Opposition Critics
The Opposition in the Canadian House of Commons: Role, Structure, and Powers | Mapleleafweb.com

40th Canadian Parliament
Canadian shadow cabinets